wikiFeet is a photo-sharing foot fetish website dedicated to sharing photos of celebrities' feet. In 2016, it was described by Vice Media's Lauren Oyler as "...the most extensive online message board and photo gallery of women's feet on the Internet". It mostly includes images of the feet of famous actors, actresses and other entertainers, though some politicians' feet are also featured on the site.

It was founded in 2008 by Eli Ozer, an Israeli former computer programmer and animator who now runs the site full-time. According to Ozer, the site gets about 3 million views a month (as of July 2017).

While the site has "wiki" in its name, it is not connected to Wikipedia or the Wikimedia Foundation.

In January 2019, WikiFeet was involved in debunking a hoax involving US congresswoman Alexandria Ocasio-Cortez; a picture of a woman's feet in a bathtub, purported to be a nude posted online by Ocasio-Cortez in 2016, was determined to be of someone else by users of the site, with the picture's short toe length being a key piece of evidence. Sydney Leathers, involved in the Anthony Weiner sexting scandals of 2013, was determined to be the owner of the feet, which she confirmed to Washington Babylon in January 2019.

In 2021, journalist Laura Bassett  discovered that a 58-year-old man named Robert Hamilton had been posting pictures of her feet to wikiFeet, by copying photographs from her Instagram feed.  He agreed to be interviewed.  He said that he considered himself a foot fetishist and had admired women's feet since his childhood.

Since June 2021, the website does not allow visitors from the European Union to browse full-resolution images because of a new EU Copyright Directive.

Notes

References

External links

Internet properties established in 2008
Image-sharing websites
2008 establishments in Israel
Fetish subculture
Israeli websites
Foot fetishism
Wikis